CAMP responsive element binding protein-like 1, also known as CREBL1, is a protein which in humans is encoded by the CREBL1 gene.

Function 

The protein encoded by this gene bears sequence similarity with the Creb/ATF subfamily of the bZip superfamily of transcription factors. It localizes to both the cytoplasm and the nucleus. The gene localizes to the major histocompatibility complex (MHC) class III region on chromosome 6.

References

Further reading

External links 
 
 

Transcription factors